Via Nazionale is a street name in several Italian towns and cities, including:
Cortona
Policastro Bussentino
Rome
Trieste